Meike Pfister (born 6 February 1996) is a German former World Cup alpine ski racer, who specialized in Super-G.

She competed at the World Championships in 2019.

World Cup results

Season standings

Top twenty finishes
 0 podiums

World Championship results

References

External links

 Meike Pfister World Cup standings at the International Ski Federation
 
 German Ski Team (DSV) – Meike Pfister – 

1996 births
Living people
German female alpine skiers
21st-century German women